Bešić is a Bosniak surname. Notable people with the surname include:

Adnan Bešić (born 1991), Slovenian professional footballer
Alen Bešić (born 1975), Serbian  literary critic, translator and poet
Alija Bešić (born 1975), Luxembourgian professional footballer
Danijel Bešič Loredan (born 1973), Slovenian orthopedic surgeon and politician
Enes Bešić (born 1963), Bosnian professional footballer
Hamza Bešić (born 2000), Bosnian footballer
Muhamed Bešić (born 1992), Bosnian professional footballer
Mustafa Bešić (born 1951), Bosnian ice hockey player

See also 

 Bešići

Bosnian surnames